Tyle Mill is a mill on the River Kennet near Sulhamstead, Berkshire, England. The mill originally produced flour; a fire in 1914 burned down the buildings and the rebuilt mill became a sawmill.
 In 1936 it was acquired by George Clemens Usher, director of Abedare Cables of South Africa Limited, and became a private house which was owned by him for decades.

Tyle Mill Lock on the Kennet Navigation is near the mill.

References

Flour mills in the United Kingdom
Sulhamstead
Houses in Berkshire